In algebraic geometry, the Nisnevich topology, sometimes called the completely decomposed topology, is a Grothendieck topology on the category of schemes which has been used in algebraic K-theory, A¹ homotopy theory, and the theory of motives.  It was originally introduced by Yevsey Nisnevich, who was motivated by the theory of adeles.

Definition 
A morphism of schemes  is called a Nisnevich morphism if it is an étale morphism such that for every (possibly non-closed) point x ∈ X, there exists a point y ∈ Y in the fiber  such that the induced map of residue fields k(x) → k(y) is an isomorphism.  Equivalently, f must be flat, unramified,  locally of finite presentation, and for every point x ∈ X, there must exist a point y in the fiber  such that k(x) → k(y) is an isomorphism.

A family of morphisms {uα : Xα → X} is a Nisnevich cover if each morphism in the family is étale and for every (possibly non-closed) point x ∈ X, there exists α and a point y ∈ Xα s.t. uα(y) = x and the induced map of residue fields k(x) → k(y) is an isomorphism. The Nisnevich covers are the covering families of a pretopology on the category of schemes and morphisms of schemes. This generates a topology called the Nisnevich topology. The category of schemes with the Nisnevich topology is notated Nis.

The small Nisnevich site of X  has as underlying category the same as the small étale site, that is to say, objects are schemes U with a fixed étale morphism U → X and the morphisms are morphisms of schemes compatible with the fixed maps to X. Admissible coverings are Nisnevich morphisms.

The big Nisnevich site of X  has  as underlying category  schemes with a fixed map to X and morphisms the morphisms of X-schemes. The topology is the one given by Nisnevich morphisms.

The Nisnevich topology has several variants which are adapted to studying singular varieties.  Covers in these topologies include resolutions of singularities or weaker forms of resolution.
 The cdh topology allows proper birational morphisms as coverings.
 The h topology allows De Jong's alterations as coverings.
 The l′ topology allows morphisms as in the conclusion of Gabber's local uniformization theorem.
The cdh and l′ topologies are incomparable with the étale topology, and the h topology is finer than the étale topology.

Equivalent conditions for a Nisnevich cover 
Another equivalent conditionpg 21 for a family of morphisms  of schemes to be a Nisnevich covering is if

 Every  is etale
 The coproduct of the induced maps  on their associated functors gives a surjective map of sets for a field .

There is an alternative characterization using finite sequences of finitely presented closed subschemeswhere the second condition is replaced with the hypothesis thatadmits a section. Notice that when evaluating these morphisms on -points, this implies the map is a surjection. Conversely, taking the trivial sequence  gives the result in the opposite direction.

Motivation 
One of the key motivations for introducing the Nisnevich topology in motivic cohomology is the fact that a Zariski open cover  does not yield a resolution of Zariski sheaveswhereis the representable functor over the category of presheaves with transfers. For the Nisnevich topology, the local rings are Henselian, and a finite cover of a Henselian ring is given by a product of Henselian rings, showing exactness.

Local rings in the Nisnevich topology 

If x is a point of a scheme X, then the local ring of x in the Nisnevich topology is the Henselization of the local ring of x in the Zariski topology. This differs from the Etale topology where the local rings are strict henselizations. One of the important points between the two cases can be seen when looking at a local ring  with residue field . In this case, the residue fields of the Henselization and strict Henselization differso the residue field of the strict Henselization gives the separable closure of the original residue field .

Examples of Nisnevich Covering 
Consider the étale cover given by

If we look at the associated morphism of residue fields for the generic point of the base, we see that this is a degree 2 extension

This implies that this étale cover is not Nisnevich.

Conditional covering 
Otherwise, the covering cannot be a surjection on -points. In this case, the covering is only an Etale covering.

Zariski coverings 
Every Zariski coveringpg 21 is Nisnevich but the converse doesn't hold in general. This can be easily proven using any of the definitions since the residue fields will always be an isomorphism regardless of the Zariski cover, and by definition a Zariski cover will give a surjection on points. In addition, Zariski inclusions are always Etale morphisms.

Applications 
Nisnevich introduced his topology to provide a cohomological interpretation of the class set of an affine group scheme, which was originally defined in adelic terms.  He used it to partially prove a conjecture of Alexander Grothendieck and Jean-Pierre Serre which states that a rationally trivial torsor under a reductive group scheme over an integral regular Noetherian base scheme is locally trivial in the Zariski topology.  One of the key properties of the Nisnevich topology is the existence of a descent spectral sequence. Let X be a Noetherian scheme of finite Krull dimension, and let Gn(X) be the Quillen K-groups of the category of coherent sheaves on X. If  is the sheafification of these groups with respect to the Nisnevich topology,  there is a convergent spectral sequence

The Nisnevich topology has also found important applications in algebraic K-theory, A¹ homotopy theory and the theory of motives.

See also 

 Presheaf with transfers
 Mixed motives (math)
 A¹ homotopy theory
 Henselian ring

References 

 , available at Nisnevich's website

 

Algebraic geometry
Topos theory